Ruska Mihaylova Manuilova (1879–1949) or better known as her stage pseudonym – Roza Popova, was a Bulgarian actress and theater director and the wife of the Bulgarian writer Chicho Stoyan.

Biography

Early life and debut 
Roza Popova was born in Sofia, Bulgaria in 1879. She married in secret a little past her 16th birthday.

She studied theatrical arts under the direction of Konstantin Sapunov. During her high school education, she found her passion of acting and joined the traveling theatrical troupe "Zora". In 1897, Roza Popova makes her debut with her role of Sophia in "Iskreno Priyatelstvo" by Sardu in Veliko Tarnovo, the old capital of Bulgaria.

However, official records state that her first major role and debut was in the play by Victor Hugo – Lucrezia Borgia (play) in the role of Lucrezia, with the collaboration of the most successful Bulgarian troupe – "Salza i Smyah". She then proceeded to play in the troupe alongside her husband, leading the troupe herself between 1900 and 1902. Afterward, she joined the Croatian troupe of M. Stoikovich.

Middle years 
In 1900 she was stalked by her admirer Todor Bogdanov, who was her teacher from Vratsa. On January 20, 1903, he shot her and himself, and died. She regained her strength despite the bad wound. She was also released from the service of the theater in the same year.

In the period between 1904 and 1906, she joined the troupe in Plovdiv.

The next town she went to was Vienna, where she studied literature and medicine in the Vienna University. During 1910 she was appointed as the first director in the Ruse theater.

In 1918 she founded her own theater "Roza Popova".

Theater roles 
Major theatre roles in which Roza Popova acted:

 Antigone - "Antigone" by Sophocles;
 Medea - "Medea" from Leguve; 
 Vela and Malama - "Vampire" by Anton Strashimirov; 
 Margarita Gauthier – "The Lady with the Camellias" by Alexandre Dumas-son;     
 Sappho – "Sappho" by Grillpartzer;     
 Sonya and Elena Andreevna – "Uncle Vanyo" by Anton Chekhov

In 1926, Teodor Trayanov devotes a poem "Skitnishki napev" to her.

References 

1879 births
1949 deaths